The 1878 Cirencester by-election was held on 12 March 1878.  The byelection was fought due to the succession to a peerage of the incumbent Conservative MP, Allen Bathurst who became the sixth Earl Bathurst.  It was won by the Conservative candidate Thomas William Chester-Master.

References

1878 in England
Cirencester
1878 elections in the United Kingdom
By-elections to the Parliament of the United Kingdom in Gloucestershire constituencies
19th century in Gloucestershire